The Boston College School of Social Work (BCSSW) is the graduate school of social work at Boston College in Chestnut Hill, Massachusetts.

Founded in 1936, it is among the nation's oldest schools of social work and provides experience-based Master of Social Work (MSW) and Doctor of Philosophy (Ph.D.) degree programs. In 2019, it was ranked as the #10 best school of social work in the United States by U.S. News & World Report. More than 8,000 alumni serve as practitioners in social service agencies, policymakers, academics, and researchers around the world.

History
The School of Social Work was founded in 1936 by Walter McGuinn, S.J., who held a Ph.D. from Fordham University, and Dorothy L. Book, an experienced social worker. McGuinn, a faculty member, petitioned both the Society of Jesus in Rome and Cardinal William Henry O'Connell of Boston for permission to open a social work program with a focus on Catholic philosophy and ethics. McGuinn served as the school's first dean.

Classes began in September 1936 at the university's downtown Boston building at 126 Newbury Street, with an enrollment of 40 students and a distinguished faculty of experts from the field. The school's curriculum included both studies about the foundations of social work and hands-on experience with social work agencies. Students could specialize in four fields: case work; public welfare; medical social work; and probation and parole; and later community organization. Two years later, the first class graduated and the school received its accreditation from the American Association of Schools of Social Work on June 28, 1938.

In 1943, Book followed McGuinn as dean, becoming the first woman dean at Boston College. She served until 1955. In 1979, the school began offering a Doctor of Social Work degree, which later was changed to a Doctor of Philosophy in Social Work. The school in September 1968 moved to the Chestnut Hill campus's McGuinn Hall, which is named for McGuinn and his brother, Rev. Albert McGuinn, S.J., who headed the chemistry department.

Academics
The School of Social Work offers two professional degrees: Masters of Social Work and Doctor of Philosophy in Social Work, as well as several dual degrees. In addition, a Latinx Leadership Initiative (LLI) trains social work leaders to work with the Latino community.

Masters of Social Work program (MSW)
The School of Social Work offers a full-time, two-year program and a part-time, three- or four-year program towards a Master's Degree of Social Work. The Clinical Program intervention method prepares students for a broad range of careers and focuses on direct service to those in need.  The Macro: Social Innovation + Leadership Program focuses on training future leaders of the public and social service sectors in the development of new ideas and directions for solving social problems.

The choice of concentration and intervention method combined with a five-elective curriculum plan allows students to customize their education to their professional and educational goals.

The School of Social Work also offers a certificate program within the MSW program that gives students the opportunity to engage in concentrated study in subject-specific areas of social work practice and expertise. Eight certificate options are offered in the areas of Child Welfare; Latino Leadership; Neuroscience & Social Work; Policy & Community Organizing; Refugees & Immigrants; School Social Work; Trauma; and Veterans & Military Families. Certificate course offerings are subject to change each semester.

Doctoral program (PhD)
The PhD program prepares rigorous researchers, scholars, and educators to advance the field of social welfare and social work practice.  A combined MSW/Ph.D. program allows exceptionally talented students to embark on doctoral coursework before completing the MSW program.

Centers, labs and institutes
The School of Social Work's research centers, labs, and institutes are renowned for conducting groundbreaking work and providing critical services.

The Center for Social Innovation promotes "innovation from within." The mission is to foster effective, sustainable social innovations that enhance social justice.

The Immigrant Integration Lab is an applied research lab exploring the intersection of social work, social policy, and immigrant inclusion.

The Center on Aging & Work focuses its research on helping the business community promote workplace flexibility and prepare for the opportunities and challenges associated with an aging workforce.

Research in Social, Economic, and Environmental Equity (RISE3) is an interdisciplinary initiative that convenes researchers from Boston College and practitioners and policymakers from around the world to address social, economic, and environmental inequality and confront issues of race, place, and poverty.

The Research Program on Children and Adversity (RPCA) investigates risk and resilience in children facing multiple forms of adversity using qualitative and quantitative research methods. RPCA works to develop feasible interventions that support positive life outcomes.

The Cell to Society Lab merges neuroscience and social work, examining neuroimaging studies of at-risk children and teenagers to understand the impact of social context on brain development.

Social Work Library
The School of Social Work is one of only a few schools of social work in the U.S., and the only one in New England, to maintain its own Social Work Library, which contains 20,000 books and a collection of e-books, major journals, and databases.

Careers
The School of Social Work is one of only a few graduate social work programs to maintain its own career services office. In a recent survey, 98% of graduates reported being employed within the first year.

References

External links
 

Boston College
Schools of social work in the United States
University subdivisions in Massachusetts